The Joy of Pregnancy is a guide to pregnancy and childbirth, written by Tori Kropp and published by The Harvard Common Press in April 2008.

Format
The Joy of Pregnancy is written  in a month-by-month format. Each chapter begins with a section on changes within mom's body and includes "Important Things to Know" for that month, such as medical tests to schedule, questions to ask the doctor, and products that should be bought for baby and mom. "Tori's Tips" are dispersed throughout the book, with specific advice from Tori relating to each month. The chapters also include question and answer sections, questions from Tori's readers, as well as information for dads in the "Dad's Corner."

Awards
The Joy of Pregnancy received The National Parenting Center's Seal of Approval in 2008. The book was also designated as a "Best Consumer Health 2008" title by Library Journal.

References

External links
The Joy of Pregnancy Book Site
The Joy of Pregnancy Info Page

Works about human pregnancy
Parenting advice books
2008 non-fiction books